Tiebas-Muruarte de Reta (Basque: Tebas-Muru Artederreta) is a town and municipality in the province and autonomous community of Navarre, northern Spain.

References

External links
 TIEBAS-MURUARTE DE RETA in the Bernardo Estornés Lasa - Auñamendi Encyclopedia (Euskomedia Fundazioa) 

Municipalities in Navarre